Integration is the basic operation in integral calculus.  While differentiation has straightforward rules by which the derivative of a complicated function can be found by differentiating its simpler component functions, integration does not, so tables of known integrals are often useful. This page lists some of the most common antiderivatives.

Historical development of integrals
A compilation of a list of integrals (Integraltafeln) and techniques of integral calculus was published by the German mathematician  (aka ) in 1810. These tables were republished in the United Kingdom in 1823. More extensive tables were compiled in 1858 by the Dutch mathematician David Bierens de Haan for his Tables d'intégrales définies, supplemented by Supplément aux tables d'intégrales définies in ca. 1864. A new edition was published in 1867 under the title Nouvelles tables d'intégrales définies. These tables, which contain mainly integrals of elementary functions, remained in use until the middle of the 20th century. They were then replaced by the much more extensive tables of Gradshteyn and Ryzhik. In Gradshteyn and Ryzhik, integrals originating from the book by Bierens de Haan are denoted by BI.

Not all closed-form expressions have closed-form antiderivatives; this study forms the subject of differential Galois theory, which was initially developed by Joseph Liouville in the 1830s and 1840s, leading to Liouville's theorem which classifies which expressions have closed form antiderivatives.

Since 1968 there is the Risch algorithm for determining indefinite integrals that can be expressed in term of elementary functions, typically using a computer algebra system. Integrals that cannot be expressed using elementary functions can be manipulated symbolically using general functions such as the Meijer G-function.

Lists of integrals
More detail may be found on the following pages for the lists of integrals:

 List of integrals of rational functions
 List of integrals of irrational functions
 List of integrals of trigonometric functions
 List of integrals of inverse trigonometric functions
 List of integrals of hyperbolic functions
 List of integrals of inverse hyperbolic functions
 List of integrals of exponential functions
 List of integrals of logarithmic functions
 List of integrals of Gaussian functions

Gradshteyn, Ryzhik, Geronimus, Tseytlin, Jeffrey, Zwillinger, and Moll's (GR) Table of Integrals, Series, and Products contains a large collection of results. An even larger, multivolume table is the Integrals and Series by Prudnikov, Brychkov, and Marichev (with volumes 1–3 listing integrals and series of elementary and special functions, volume 4–5 are tables of Laplace transforms). More compact collections can be found in e.g. Brychkov, Marichev, Prudnikov's Tables of Indefinite Integrals, or as chapters in Zwillinger's CRC Standard Mathematical Tables and Formulae or Bronshtein and Semendyayev's Guide Book to Mathematics, Handbook of Mathematics or Users' Guide to Mathematics, and other mathematical handbooks.

Other useful resources include Abramowitz and Stegun and the Bateman Manuscript Project. Both works contain many identities concerning specific integrals, which are organized with the most relevant topic instead of being collected into a separate table. Two volumes of the Bateman Manuscript are specific to integral transforms.

There are several web sites which have tables of integrals and integrals on demand. Wolfram Alpha can show results, and for some simpler expressions, also the intermediate steps of the integration. Wolfram Research also operates another online service, the  Mathematica Online Integrator.

Integrals of simple functions
C is used for an arbitrary constant of integration that can only be determined if something about the value of the integral at some point is known. Thus, each function has an infinite number of antiderivatives.

These formulas only state in another form the assertions in the table of derivatives.

Integrals with a singularity
When there is a singularity in the function being integrated such that the antiderivative becomes undefined or at some point (the singularity), then C does not need to be the same on both sides of the singularity. The forms below normally assume the Cauchy principal value around a singularity in the value of C but this is not in general necessary. For instance in

there is a singularity at 0 and the antiderivative becomes infinite there. If the integral above were to be used to compute a definite integral between −1 and 1, one would get the wrong answer 0. This however is the Cauchy principal value of the integral around the singularity. If the integration is done in the complex plane the result depends on the path around the origin, in this case the singularity contributes −i when using a path above the origin and i for a path below the origin. A function on the real line could use a completely different value of C on either side of the origin as in:

Rational functions

The following function has a non-integrable singularity at 0 for :
 (Cavalieri's quadrature formula)

More generally,

Exponential functions

(if  is a positive integer)
(if  is a positive integer)

Logarithms

Trigonometric functions

 (See Integral of the secant function. This result was a well-known conjecture in the 17th century.)

 (See integral of secant cubed.)

Inverse trigonometric functions

Hyperbolic functions

Inverse hyperbolic functions

Products of functions proportional to their second derivatives

Absolute-value functions
Let  be a continuous function, that has at most one zero. Then

where  is the sign function, which takes the values −1, 0, 1 when  is respectively negative, zero or positive.

This gives the following formulas (where ), which are valid over any interval where  is continuous (over larger intervals, the constant  must be replaced by a piecewise constant function):
when  for some integer .
when  for some integer .
when  for some integer .
when  for some integer .

For having a continuous antiderivative, one has thus to add a well chosen step function. If we also use the fact that the absolute values of sine and cosine are periodic with period , then we get:

Special functions
, : Trigonometric integrals, : Exponential integral, : Logarithmic integral function, : Error function

Definite integrals lacking closed-form antiderivatives

There are some functions whose antiderivatives cannot be expressed in closed form. However, the values of the definite integrals of some of these functions over some common intervals can be calculated. A few useful integrals are given below.

 (see also Gamma function)
 for 
 when 
  (see also Bernoulli number)

 (see sinc function and the Dirichlet integral)

(if  is a positive integer and !! is the double factorial).
(for  real,  a non-negative integer, and  an odd, positive integer; since the integrand is odd)
(where  is the Gamma function)

  (where  is the modified Bessel function of the first kind)

If the function  has bounded variation on the interval , then the method of exhaustion provides a formula for the integral:

The "sophomore's dream":

attributed to Johann Bernoulli.

See also

References

Further reading 

 
 (Several previous editions as well.)
 . Second revised edition (Russian), volume 1–3, Fiziko-Matematicheskaya Literatura, 2003.
 Yuri A. Brychkov (Ю. А. Брычков), Handbook of Special Functions: Derivatives, Integrals, Series and Other Formulas. Russian edition, Fiziko-Matematicheskaya Literatura, 2006. English edition, Chapman & Hall/CRC Press, 2008,  / 9781584889564.
 Daniel Zwillinger. CRC Standard Mathematical Tables and Formulae, 31st edition. Chapman & Hall/CRC Press, 2002. . (Many earlier editions as well.)
 , Integraltafeln oder Sammlung von Integralformeln (Duncker und Humblot, Berlin, 1810)
 , Integral Tables Or A Collection of Integral Formulae (Baynes and son, London, 1823) [English translation of Integraltafeln]
 David Bierens de Haan, Nouvelles Tables d'Intégrales définies (Engels, Leiden, 1862)
 Benjamin O. Pierce A short table of integrals - revised edition (Ginn & co., Boston, 1899)

External links

Tables of integrals 
 Paul's Online Math Notes
 A. Dieckmann, Table of Integrals (Elliptic Functions, Square Roots, Inverse Tangents and More Exotic Functions): Indefinite Integrals Definite Integrals
 Math Major: A Table of Integrals
  Derived integrals of exponential, logarithmic functions and special functions.
 Rule-based Integration Precisely defined indefinite integration rules covering a wide class of integrands

Derivations 
 Victor Hugo Moll, The Integrals in Gradshteyn and Ryzhik

Online service 
 Integration examples for Wolfram Alpha

Open source programs 
wxmaxima gui for Symbolic and numeric resolution of many mathematical problems

Videos 
 The Single Most Overpowered Integration Technique in Existence. YouTube Video by Flammable Maths on symmetries

 
Integrals
Mathematical identities